The second-generation antidepressants are a class of antidepressants characterized primarily by the era of their introduction, approximately coinciding with the 1970s and 1980s, rather than by their chemical structure or by their pharmacological effect. As a consequence, there is some controversy over which treatments actually belong in this class.

The term "third generation antidepressant" is sometimes used to refer to newer antidepressants, from the 1990s and 2000s, often selective serotonin reuptake inhibitors (SSRIs) such as; fluoxetine (Prozac), paroxetine (Paxil) and sertraline (Zoloft), as well as some non-SSRI antidepressants such as mirtazapine, nefazodone, venlafaxine, duloxetine and reboxetine. However, this usage is not universal.

Examples
This list is not exhaustive, and different sources vary upon which items should be considered second-generation.

 Amineptine
 Amoxapine
 Bupropion
 Iprindole
 Maprotiline
 Medifoxamine
 Mianserin
 Nomifensine
 Tianeptine
 Trazodone
 Venlafaxine
 Viloxazine

See also
 Atypical antidepressant
 Development and discovery of SSRI drugs
 Pharmacology of antidepressants
 Tricyclic antidepressant
 Tetracyclic antidepressant
 Serotonin–norepinephrine reuptake inhibitor
 Serotonin antagonist and reuptake inhibitor
 Noradrenergic and specific serotonergic antidepressant

References

External links
 
 Diagrams at toxlab.co.uk
 Overview at sagepub.com
 Overview at psyweb.com
 Overview at sciencedaily.com
 Overview at sabryabdelfattah.tripod.com

Antidepressants